Roch Valley Viaduct was built in the 1860s in Rochdale, Greater Manchester and carried the Rochdale to Bacup railway line between Rochdale and Wardleworth stations.

It was demolished in 1972. A trial explosion was carried out at one arch at the section over the River Roch, and inadvertently, the rest of the viaduct came down as well. Nobody was hurt, but gas and water mains were disrupted and a road was blocked.

References

Images of Rochdale by Rochdale Metropoliton Borough Council and The Rochdale Observer

Buildings and structures in Rochdale
Railway viaducts in Greater Manchester
Demolished bridges in England
Buildings and structures demolished in 1972